Australian singer and songwriter Ricki-Lee Coulter has released four studio albums, one compilation album, twenty singles, and seventeen music videos. Coulter placed seventh in the second season of Australian Idol in 2004, and subsequently signed with independent label Shock Records. Coulter's self-titled debut album Ricki-Lee was released in October 2005, which debuted at number 30 on the ARIA Albums Chart. The album produced two top-ten singles, "Hell No!" and "Sunshine", which were both certified gold by the Australian Recording Industry Association (ARIA). Coulter briefly became a member of the Australian pop girl group Young Divas the following year, before resuming her solo career early in 2007.

Coulter's second studio album Brand New Day was released in August 2007, which peaked at number 37 and was certified gold. The album was preceded by the lead single "Can't Touch It", which peaked at number two on the ARIA Singles Chart and was certified platinum. It also produced two other top-ten singles, "Love Is All Around" and "Can't Sing a Different Song". Coulter's first compilation album Ricki-Lee: The Singles was released in November 2008, but failed to impact the charts. Its lead single "Wiggle It" peaked at number 11. Coulter was expected to release her third studio album Hear No, See No, Speak No in November 2009, but she decided to cancel the album's release due to its first two singles struggling on the charts. The album's lead single "Don't Miss You" peaked at number 24, while the second single "Hear No, See No, Speak No" peaked at number 46.

Coulter ended her contract with Shock Records in 2011 and signed with major label EMI Music Australia. Her third studio album Fear & Freedom was released in August 2012, which debuted at number seven and became Coulter's first top ten album. It included the top twenty singles "Raining Diamonds" and "Do It Like That", which were both certified platinum. The latter became Coulter's first song to chart in Japan, where it peaked at number seven on the Japan Hot 100 chart. Coulter's fourth studio album Dance in the Rain was released in October 2014, which debuted at number 14 and became her second top-fifteen album. The album included the singles "All We Need Is Love" and "Happy Ever After".

Albums

Studio albums

Compilation albums

Singles

Other charted songs

Album appearances

Music videos

See also
 Young Divas discography

Notes

References

External links
 
 [ Ricki-Lee Coulter at Allmusic.com]

Discography
Discographies of Australian artists
Pop music discographies
Rhythm and blues discographies